Mahendra Gupte (11 April 1931 – 7 May 2017) was an Indian cricket umpire. He stood in one Test match, India vs. England in 1985 and one ODI game, India vs. West Indies, in 1983.

See also
 List of Test cricket umpires
 List of One Day International cricket umpires

References

1931 births
2017 deaths
Place of birth missing
Indian Test cricket umpires
Indian One Day International cricket umpires